Santander is the capital of the autonomous community and historical region of Cantabria situated on the north coast of Spain. It is a port city located east of Gijón and west of Bilbao with a population of 172,000 (2017).

It is believed to have been a port since ancient times, due to its favourable location, and is documented as far back as the 11th century. Much of the medieval city was lost in the Great Fire of 1941. Today, its remaining old town, beach and other attractions are popular with tourists and other visitors and its economy is mainly service based. The port is still very active and a regular ferry service operates to the United Kingdom. Fish and seafood dominate the local cuisine. Santander notably houses the headquarters of multinational bank Banco Santander, which was founded there. The city has a mild climate typical of the Spanish northern coastline with frequent rainfall and stable temperatures. Cold snaps and heat waves are very rare.

History

Origins, Roman period and Middle Ages
The origin of the earliest human settlements in the current Santander is not easy to establish because there is little written and archaeological data. However, there would appear to be good practical reasons for ancient settlers to have chosen the north side of the bay, sheltered from it and safer from the storms of the Bay of Biscay, on the north side of the promontory of Somorrostro and along the ancient Becedo estuary. Moreover, the hillside provided good visibility for spotting potential attackers, making this the ideal place for the foundation of a stable settlement, which was to evolve throughout the Middle Ages.

Although it is mentioned for the first time in 1068, in a draft document made by King Sancho II, in the 9th century Alfonso II the Chaste founded the Abbey of the Holy Bodies in the existing chapel on the hill of Somorrostro, housing as holy relics the heads of Saint Emeterius and Saint Celedonius and the graves of other unknown martyrs, giving the abbey its name.

Alfonso VIII of Castile granted the city a fuero (charter) in 1187.

During the 12th and 13th centuries the population was contained within the walls of two different pueblas. La Puebla, the older, on the hill overlooking the city facing the bay, included the old castle, the Abbey of the Holy Bodies and the cloister. It had three rows of houses, separated by Rua Carnicerias and Rua Mayor, where the homes of prominent people of the town were, as well as those of the Abbot's canons. Meanwhile, the Puebla Nueva contained the convent of Santa Clara and San Francisco, which gave its name to one of the main streets; other important streets were the Rua de la Sal, The cavalcade Palace, Ribera, Don Gutierre, Puerta de la Sierra, Gallows and the Arcillero Rua. The two pueblas were joined by a bridge over the river that divided Becedo and flowed down to the shipyards, which were ordered by the king to take timber from the Cantabrian forests for shipbuilding. The villa was required to give the monarchy a ship per year.

By the end of the 15th century Santander had a population of about 4,000 or 5,000 inhabitants.

The city owes its existence to the excellent harbour of the Bay of Santander. Santander was an important port for Castile in the later Middle Ages, and also for trade with the New World. It officially became a city in 1755.

Cabo Machichaco explosions

On 3 November 1893 a steamship, caught fire while she was being unloaded at a pier in the heart of the city. A crowd of 2,000 to 3,000 people watched as crew and firefighters fought the fire. About 40 tonnes of dynamite being carried in her forward holds exploded, killing about 590 people, injuring about 2,000, sinking the ship and destroying at least 65 buildings near the harbour.

On 21 March 1894 a salvage diver working to salvage cargo from Cabo Machichacos wreck accidentally detonated about 11 tonnes of dynamite that were submerged in the after hold of the ship. 18 people were killed and 11 injured.

Great Fire of 1941

Santander fell victim to a great fire in 1941. Fanned by a strong south wind, the fire burned for two days. The fire started in Cádiz Street, next to the harbour, the Cathedral and the medieval quarter. The fire destroyed the Old Town Hall, Jesús de Monasterio and Vargas streets and Atarazanas square buildings. It led to a major change in the architecture of Santander, away from the older small stone and wood buildings with balconies to the enormous blocks of flats built during the reconstruction. 

There was only one casualty of the fire, a firefighter from Madrid killed in the line of duty, but thousands of families were left homeless and the city was plunged into chaos. The fire destroyed the greater part of the medieval town centre and gutted the city's Romanesque cathedral.

Geography
The city is located on the northern side of the Bay of Santander.

Climate
The city of Santander has an oceanic climate (Köppen climate classification Cfb), the annual thermal oscillation of the average monthly temperatures reaching around 10 °C (18 °F).

Warm months (mean above ) are however rare.

Sunshine hours are very low by comparison with the rest of mainland and southern Spain. Even compared with other areas of northern Spain, such as Galicia, which have much more sunshine hours in coastal cities such as Vigo or Pontevedra. With just around 1650 hours of sunshine, Santander's southern areas are about as sunny as London and Paris, and quite a bit less sunny than most of England's south coastal regions. The area closer to the coast has higher sunshine time but lower summer afternoon temperatures.

Tourism and sights
The bars and restaurants of the old town are popular with tourists, as well as the El Sardinero beach a couple of kilometres away.

The Cathedral of Santander: The lower temple, called "cripta del Cristo" was built around 1200 on other earlier Roman buildings. Its style is a transition from Romanesque to Gothic.

The Lighthouse of Cabo Mayor presides over the entrance to the Bay of Santander.

Parque de la Vaguada de las Llamas is one of the largest parks in northern Spain, covering  of the city.

Santander is pilot for a Smart city. It is embedded with 12,000 sensors.

Politics and government
The People's Party were the leading party in the municipal elections of 1999, 2003, 2007, 2011, 2015, and 2019.

Economy

As a service centre at the regional level, Santander contains important public institutions and private organisations with a large number of employees, including Marqués de Valdecilla University Hospital, the University of Cantabria and Grupo Santander. Activities related to culture, leisure and tourism are an important part of the city's economy, and the regional and municipal authorities look to augment the summer tourist trade with additional offerings, including conventions, conferences, cultural festivals and cruises. Banco Santander, Spain's largest bank and corporation, has had its legal headquarters located in the city since its foundation.

Transport
There are ferry services to and from Portsmouth and Plymouth in the United Kingdom and Cork in Ireland, all operated by Brittany Ferries. Santander railway station serves three million annual passengers.

Education

University of Cantabria is the largest university in Cantabria.
European University of the Atlantic is a private university founded in 2013.
Universidad Internacional Menéndez Pelayo (UIMP) specializes in teaching Spanish and culture to foreign students.
Central Library of Cantabria, founded in 1839

Culture
Santander has a great tradition and cultural activity, with events that play an important role in cultural and social life of the city. UIMP is a major international summer university and organizes large festivals of music and dance. The Festival Internacional de Santander (FIS), Festival Internacional de Música de Órgano (FiMÓC), Encuentro de Música y Academia and the Paloma O'Shea International Piano Competition are main cultural events.

Diet

Santander's cuisine is characteristic of Cantabria in that it is based mainly on seafood. Popular shellfish include almejas (clams) and navajas (razor clams); fish include seabream, red mullet, anchovies, seabass and sardines; and squid and cuttlefish are also commonly eaten.

Some typical dishes from the city of Santander are the fried calamari called rabas, double donuts, bean stew called cocido montañés, and seafood dishes ranging from seabass and sardine to products such as morguera.

Notable people

Historical figures 
 Francisco Marroquin (1499–1563), first bishop of Guatemala and provisional Governor of Guatemala
 Toribio de Peñalva (c.1606-c.1685), Spanish military man, Procurator General of Buenos Aires during the Viceroyalty of Peru
 Manuel Pardo (1774–?), a Spanish soldier, the Interim Governor of Spanish Texas in 1817
 José de Madrazo y Agudo (1781–1859), a Spanish painter and engraver, an exponent of the Neoclassical

19th century 
 Jenaro Quesada, 1st Marquis of Miravalles (1818–1889) Grandee of Spain and Spanish soldier
 José Antonio Mijares (1819–1847) a Mexican Army Lieutenant who led the Mexican resistance force against the American garrison of San José del Cabo in the Battle of San José del Cabo
 Rafael Izquierdo y Gutiérrez (1820–1883) a Spanish Military Officer, politician, and statesman; Governor-General of the Philippines from 1871 to 1873
 Marcelino Sanz de Sautuola (1831–1888) a Spanish jurist, amateur archaeologist, owned the land of the Cave of Altamira
 Marcelino Menéndez y Pelayo (1856–1912) a Spanish scholar, historian and literary critic. 
 Francisco Iturrino (1864–1924) a Spanish Post-impressionist painter of Basque ancestry, sometimes called a Fauvist
 Concha Espina (c.1877–1955) a Spanish writer nominated for a Nobel prize in literature 25 times in nine years
 Marcial Solana González-Camino (1880–1958) a Spanish scholar, writer and politician; historian of philosophy
 María Gutiérrez Blanchard (1881–1932) a Spanish painter, developed a unique style of Cubism
 Ángel Herrera Oria (1886–1968) a Spanish journalist, Roman Catholic politician and later a cardinal
 Gerardo Diego (1896–1987) a Spanish poet, a member of the Generation of '27

20th century 
 Emilio Botín (1903–1993), a Spanish banker, the chairman of Santander Group from 1950 to 1986
 José Luis Zamanillo (1903–1980), a Traditionalist politician and leader of Carlist paramilitary Requeté structures 
 Francisco de Borbón y Borbón (1912–1995), a Spanish aristocrat, Lieutenant General of the cavalry in the Spanish army
 Matilde Camus (1919–2012), a Spanish poet who also wrote non-fiction
 Elena Quiroga (1921–1995), Spanish writer, explored the themes of childhood and adolescence
 Daniel Gil (1930–2004), one of the leading Spanish graphic designers of the 20th century
 Emilio Botín (1934–2014), a Spanish banker, executive chairman of Spain's Grupo Santander
 Juan Carlos Calderon (1938–2012), a Spanish singer-songwriter and musician
 Álvaro Pombo (born 1939), a Spanish poet, novelist and activist
 Juan Navarro Baldeweg (born 1939), architect and professor at the Superior Technical School of Architecture of Madrid
 Alfonso Vallejo (born 1943), playwright, poet, painter and neurologist
 Germán Gullón (born 1945), literary critic, writer and professor of Spanish literature at the University of Amsterdam
 Domingo Sarrey (born 1948), a visual artist and video artist.
 José Antonio Rodríguez Vega (1957–2002), nicknamed El Mataviejas (The Old Lady Killer), was a Spanish serial killer who raped and killed at least 16 elderly women in and around Santander between August 1987 and April 1988
 Álvaro Longoria (born 1968), a film director, executive producer and actor

Athletes 
 Marcos Alonso Imaz (1933–2012), nicknamed Marquitos, was a Spanish footballer, 272 pro appearances
 José Pérez Francés (born 1936), a Spanish former professional road racing cyclist
 Francisco Javier Aguilar Garcia (born 1949), a Spanish retired professional footballer 300 pro appearances
 Seve Ballesteros (1957–2011), a Spanish professional golfer and World No. 1
 Quique Setién (born 1958), a Spanish retired footballer, 518 pro appearances, former coach of FC Barcelona
 Marcos Alonso Peña (born 1959), a Spanish retired footballer, and a current coach, 309 pro appearances
 Iván Helguera (born 1975), a Spanish football player, 326 pro appearances
 Pedro Munitis (born 1975), a Spanish football player, 475 pro appearances
 Iván de la Peña (born 1976), a Spanish football player, 331 pro appearances
 Mario Bermejo (born 1978), a Spanish retired professional footballer, 546 pro appearances
 Ruth Beitia (born 1979), high jumper, gold medallist at the 2016 Olympic Games
 Gonzalo Colsa (born 1979), a Spanish retired footballer 394 pro appearances

Sports
Racing de Santander is the main football team in the city, playing their home games at the Campos de Sport de El Sardinero.

Some elite teams of Santander:

See also
 Nuevo Santander, a region of the Viceroyalty of New Spain named after the city

References
Citations

Bibliography

Bibliography

External links

Official tourism website
 
Webcams de Santander y Cantabria — Live webcams Santander and Cantabria.
Ayuntamiento de Santander — Official website of the Santander City Council (In Spanish).
Webcam en Puertochico — Live webcam of Santander's Puertochico district.

 
Municipalities in Cantabria
Port cities and towns on the Spanish Atlantic coast
Populated coastal places in Spain